Kierpień , German Kerpen, is a village in the administrative district of Gmina Głogówek, within Prudnik County, Opole Voivodeship, in south-western Poland, close to the Czech border.

Before 1945 the area was a part of Germany.

References 

Villages in Prudnik County